Brunei participated at the 2011 Southeast Asian Games which was held in the cities of Palembang and Jakarta, Indonesia from 11 November 2011 to 22 November 2011.

Competitors

Medals

Medal table

Medals by date

Medalists

2011
Nations at the 2011 Southeast Asian Games
South